Nyctemera arctata is a moth of the family Erebidae. It is found in India, China, Nepal, Bhutan, Myanmar, the Philippines, Taiwan and Indonesia. The species was described by Francis Walker in 1856.

Subspecies
Nyctemera arctata arctata (Yunnan, Tibet, Nepal, Bhutan, northern India, north-eastern India, Burma)
Nyctemera arctata albofasciata (Wileman, 1911) (Taiwan, Philippines: Luzon)
Nyctemera arctata scalarium (Vollenhoven, 1863) (Java)
Nyctemera arctata zerenoides (Butler, 1881) (Sumatra)

References

Moths described in 1856
Nyctemerina